The Nezak Huns (Pahlavi: 𐭭𐭩𐭰𐭪𐭩 nycky), also Nezak Shahs, was a significant principality in the south of the Hindu Kush region of South Asia from circa 484 to 665 CE. Despite being traditionally identified as the last of the Hunnic states, their ethnicity remains disputed and speculative. The dynasty is primarily evidenced by coinage inscribing a characteristic water-buffalo-head crown and an eponymous legend.

The Nezak Huns rose to power after the Sasanian Empire's defeat by the Hephthalites. Their founder may have been a Huna ally or an indigenous ruler who had accepted tributary status. Little is known about the intermediary rulers; they received regular diplomatic missions from the Tang dynasty, and some coexisted with the Alchon Huns from about the mid-sixth century. The polity collapsed in the mid-seventh century after experiencing increasingly frequent invasions from the Arab frontier. A vassal usurped the throne and established the Turk Shahis.

Etymology
In contemporary sources, the word "Nezak" appears either as the Arabic  or the Pahlavi . The former was used only to describe the Nezak Tarkhans while the latter was used in the coinage of the Nezaks. The etymology remains disputed; Frantz Grenet sees a possible—yet not firmly established—connection with Middle Persian  ("spear") while János Harmatta traces back to the unattested Saka * "fighter, warrior" from * "to fight".

From a review of Chinese chronicles, Minoru Inaba, a historian of medieval Central Asia at Kyoto University, concludes  has been both a personal name and titular epithet across multiple Turkic tribes.

Territory 
The Nezak Huns ruled over the State of Jibin, which is also referred to as Kapisi — formerly Cao — by contemporaneous Buddhist pilgrims. , during Xuanzang's visit, Kapisi composed eleven vassal-principalities, including Lampā, Varṇu, Nagarahāra, and Gandhara; Taxila had been only recently lost to Kashmir.

Sources

Literature

Pilgrim Travelogues 

The earliest mention of Kapisi is from Jñānagupta, a Buddhist pilgrim; he stayed there in 554 CE while travelling to Tokharistan. Dharmagupta (d. 619), a South-Indian Buddhist monk, had visited the polity in the early seventh century, but his biography by Yan Cong is not extant. 

The contemporary Chinese Buddhist monk Xuanzang, who visited Kapisi in about 630, provides the most detailed description of Kapisi under the Nezaks, even though he never mentions the name of the ruling dynasty. Xuanzang met the king in Udabhandapura and then traveled with him to Ghazni and Kabul.

Chinese Histories 
The  and Old Book of Tang record thirteen missions from Jibin to the Tang Court from 619 to 665; while they do not mention the name of the ruling dynasty, historians assume a reference to the Nezaks.

The names of the ten intermediary rulers remain unknown — Ziad, however, cautions the reference to twelve generations was probably not intended in the literal sense. The last mention of the dynasty is in 661 or 662 when the chronicles record the king of Jibin received a formal investiture from the Chinese court as Military Administrator and Commander-in-Chief of Xiuxian Area and eleven prefectures. Various compilations of the Tang Dynasty would continue to mention the Kings of Jibin, emphasizing that they wore a bull-head crown.

Coinage

Phase I 

The Nezaks started to mint their coins on the model of Sasanian coinage but incorporated Alkhon iconography alongside their distinctive styles. The result was unique, as Xuanzang noted. There were four types of drachms and obols in circulation. Coins exhibit progressive debasement as silver decrease in favour of alloys incorporating increasing quantities of copper.

The obverse depicts a male bust occupying the centre; the facial profile varies. The figure always adorns a symmetrically winged crown—derived from Sasanian ruler Peroz I's third phase of mints under Hephthalite captivity—which is supplemented on top with a water buffalo-head; this "buffalo-crown" became the defining characteristic of the Nezaks. A wing-shaped vegetal appendage, borrowed from Alchon coinage, is found just beneath the bust. The figure also wears a necklace with two flying ribbons of slightly varying shapes and an earring with two beads; some samples include a Brahmi akshara of uncertain significance beneath the ribbons. Circumscribed on the right is a Pahlavi legend meaning "King of the Nezak", which leads to the dynastic nomenclature. An "ā" (𐭠) or a "š" (𐭮), perhaps corresponding to the mints of Ghazni and Kabul, follows. 

On the reverse, the Sasanian-type, consisting of the lit Zoroastrian fire-altar with two attendants carrying barsom bundles, was adopted, but unique "sun-wheels" were added above their heads. The flame shape widely varies between a triangle, feather and bush. Two Brahmi aksharas are occasionally present.

Phase II: Alchon-Nezak crossovers and derivatives 

Hoards containing Alchon overstrikes against Nezak flans by Toramana II have been discovered around Kabul. Further, a class of drachms and unprecedented coppers—termed the Alchon-Nezak crossover—have Nezak busts adorned in Alchon-styled crescent crowns alongside a variably contracted version of the Pahlavi legend and the Alchon tamgha on the obverse.

These crossovers evolved into a series in which a new legend, either in Bactrian or Brahmi, replaces the characteristic Pahlavi legend. Finds from around the Sakra region—a sacred complex in ancient Gandhara— feature votive coins of these two kinds as well as derivatives in abundance where the structures on the reverse and the Alchon tamgha lose their meaning and degenerate into geometrical motifs but the design of the Nezak-inspired bust remains largely conserved. Whether these coins were issued by the later Nezaks or early Turk Shahis remains debated.

History

Origins and establishment
The Nezaks were the last of the four "Hunic" states known collectively as Xionites or "Hunas", their predecessors being, in chronological order; the Kidarites, the Hephthalites, and the Alchons. They took control of Zabulistan after the defeat and eventual death of Sassanian Emperor Peroz I by the Hephthalites. Their capital was at modern-day Bagram.

The name of their founder was only recorded by the Chinese chronicles of the thirteenth diplomatic mission (658) as Xinnie—which has since been reconstructed as "Khingal"—who may have been identical with Khingila (430-495) of the Alchon Huns. The presence of Nezak bull's heads in some Alchon coins minted at Gandhara supports a link between the two groups. However, Shōshin Kuwayama—primarily depending on Xuanzang's recording the rulers of Kapisi as Kshatriya, about two centuries later, and the absence of Hunnic identifiers in coinage—ascribes an indigenous origin to the dynasty. Vondrovec finds his arguments to be unpersuasive. Inaba proposes that the Nezaks were indigenous but being a tributary state of the Hephthalites, had to accept Turkish titles. Waleed Ziad and Matthias Pfisterer reject the existence of any means to speculate on the ethnic identity of the Nezaks—Khingila is a very common name in the history of Asia Minor, that was probably a title that commanded respect; and Hindu societies had a history of absorbing alien warriors within the Kshatriya fold.

Overlap with Alchons and Sassanians 
Between 528 and 532, the Alchons had to withdraw from mainland India into Kashmir and Gandhara under Mihirakula. Göbl proposed that a few decades later, they had migrated further westward via the Khyber pass into Kabulistan; scholars agree, on the evidence of the Alchon-Nezak crossover mints, this migration did occur and brought them in contact with the Nezaks. Whether the Alchons co-ruled with the Nezaks, submitted to them or nominally subdued them remains speculative. 

Around the same time, the Sasanian Empire under Khosrow I allied with the Western Turks to defeat the Hepthalites and took control of Bactria. They may also have usurped Zabulistan from the Nezaks, as suggested by the creation of Sasanian coin mints in the area of Kandahar during the reign of Ohrmazd IV (578-590). However, the Alchon-Nezaks (?) appear to have recaptured Zabulistan by the end of the sixth century. 

These interactions left little long-lasting influence on the territorial extents of the Nezaks; when Xuanzang visited them in about 630, they were arguably in their prime. In 653, a Tang dynasty diplomatic mission recorded that the crown prince had acceded to the throne of Jibin; scholars assume this prince to be Ghar-ilchi, who five years later would be recorded as the twelfth Nezak ruler in the thirteenth diplomatic mission.

Decline: Rashidun and Umayyad invasions

In 654, an army of around 6,000 Arabs led by Abd al-Rahman ibn Samura of the Rashidun caliphate attacked Zabul and laid seize to Rukhkhaj and Zamindawar, eventually conquering Bost and Zabulistan—while records do not mention the names and dynastic affiliations of the subdued rulers, it is plausible that the Nezaks suffered severe territorial losses. In 661, an unnamed ruler—possibly, Ghar-Ilchi—was confirmed as Governor of Jibin under the newly formed Chinese Anxi Protectorate, and would broker a peace treaty with the Arabs, who were reeling from the First Fitna and lost their gains. In 665, Abd al-Rahman ibn Samura occupied Kabul after a months-long siege but was soon ousted; the city was reoccupied after another year-long siege. The Nezaks were mortally weakened though their ruler—who is not named in sources but might have been Ghar-ilchi—was spared upon converting to Islam. 

They were replaced by the Turk Shahis, probably first in Kabul and later throughout the territory, sometime soon. According to Hyecho, who visited the region about 50 years after the events, the first Turk Shahi ruler of Kapisi—named Barha Tegin by Al-Biruni—was a usurper who served as a military commander (or vassal) in the service of the preceding king. Xuanzang, returning via Kapisa in 643, had noted Turks ruling over Vrijsthana/Fulishisatangna—a polity between Kapisi and Gandhara that was likely located in the region of modern-day Kabul—and Barha Tegin might have had belonged to them. Baladhuri notes of the "Kabul Shah" to have purged all Muslims out of Kabul (city - ?) in 668, drawing Arab forces into renewed offensive; if the "Kabul Shah" alludes to the last Nezak, the resulting conflict might have provided a ground for the rise of Turk Shahis.

According to Kuwayama, the Nezaks probably survived as a local chieftaincy centred in or around the town of Kapisi for a few more decades; archaeological evidence obtained from the excavation of Begram points to a gradual decline.

Religion 
During Xuanzang's visit, Buddhism was the dominant religion; the region had over a hundred monasteries—especially around the capital. The ruler commissioned an -high image of the Buddha every year and held an assembly for dispensing alms. Nevertheless, religious pluralism was evident in the hundreds of temples for the "Devas" (Hindu deities) and many "heretical" (non-Buddhist) ascetics. Buddhism declined south of the capital, and monasteries in Gandhara bore a deserted look. Xuanzang also alluded to a conflict between two heretic sects—those who worshipped "Zhuna" and those Sun—resulting in the former migrating to neighbouring Zabul.

Link with Nezak Tarkhans 
At least two rulers in Western Tokharistan used the appellation "Nezak Tarkhan"; like "Shah", "Tarkhan" was a popular title among rulers in Central Asia. One of these Nezak Tarkhans played an essential role in leading a revolt against the Arab commander Qutayba ibn Muslim in around 709 to 710 and was even promised aid by the Turk Shahis. Historians have speculated about possible relations with the Nezak Huns.

Notes

References

Sources

Further reading
 

Dynasties of Afghanistan
History of Ghazni Province
Nomadic groups in Eurasia
Huns
Historical Iranian peoples
Ancient history of Afghanistan
Former countries in Asia
Former empires